Marco Martins (born 1972) is a Portuguese Film and Theatre director, best known for his 2005 film Alice, which premiered at Cannes and won the Best Picture Award at the Directors' Fortnight.

Biography
In 1994 Marco Martins graduated from Lisbon Theatre and Film School (Escola Superior de Teatro e Cinema), and soon afterwards undertook an apprenticeship with Wim Wenders, Manoel de Oliveira and Bertrand Tavernier.

During this period, his short films Mergulho no Ano Novo and No Caminho Para a Escola received critical acclaim, the former winning Best Short Film Award at the International Short Films Festival of Vila do Conde, and the latter taking Best Short Film and Best Director Awards at the VII Festival Ibérico de Cinema de Badajoz as well as the Eixo Atlântico Award at the Festival de Ourense.

In 2005, his first feature film, Alice, premiered at the Cannes Film Festival, and received a number of international awards and made the long list for the Academy Awards Foreign Language Film prize.

A year later Marco Martins collaborates with screenwriter Tonino Guerra (a regular collaborator with Michelangelo Antonioni, Fellini, Tarkovsky or Theo Angelopoulos) in the film A Longer Year premiered at the 2006 Venice Film Festival in competition.

In 2007, together with the actress Beatriz Batarda, he created the theater company Arena Ensemble. A creative platform where he develops a work with a strong experimental and social component. His works, for the stage, have been presented on the main national stages and in international festivals. In 2018, his show Provisional Figures, created with the Portuguese community of Great Yarmouth, debuted at the Norwich / Norfolk International Festival. His most recent creation Perfil Perdu debuted at the Istanbul International Festival.

In 2011 the director collaborated with the artist Filipa César in the short film Insert, part of the artist's exhibition at the Centro Cultural de Belém, which would win the prestigious BES PHOTO prize and debut at the Rotterdam International Festival.

In 2013, Marco Martins collaborates with the Italian artist Michelangelo Pistoletto in the creation of the film Twenty-One-Twelve- The Day The World Didn't End premiered at the Louvre Museum and at the Rome Festival.

In 2016 directed São Jorge presented at Venice Film Festival ( Golden Lion Best actor) and portuguese contender to the oscars.

Filmography

Cinema 

 Saint George (São Jorge) (2016)
 Twenty-One-Twelve: The Day the World Didn't End (2013)
 Keep Going (2011)
 Traces of a Diary (2009 / 2010) (documentário)
 Insert (2010 / 2011) (curta-metragem)
 How to Draw a Perfect Circle (Como Desenhar um Círculo Perfeito) (2009 / 2010)
 A Longer Year (Um Ano Mais Longo) (2006 / 2007) (curta-metragem)
 Alice (2005 / 2006)
 On My Way to School (No Caminho para a Escola) (1998) (curta-metragem)
 Clockwise (1996) (curta-metragem)
 Não Basta Ser Cruel (1995) (curta-metragem)
 New Year´s Dive (Mergulho no Ano Novo) (1992) (curta-metragem)

TV 

 Sara (2018)

Awards and festivals

References 
Por Outro Lado, interview with Ana Sousa Dias, Marco Martins and Nuno Lopes for RTP.
Alice DVD Special Edition, Lusomundo, Portugal

External links

 https://vimeo.com/marcomartins
 Site oficial de Alice
https://variety.com/2005/film/awards/alice-3-1200525802/
https://www.screendaily.com/alice/4023383.article
https://next.liberation.fr/cinema/2005/05/18/alice-absence-aigue_520205
https://www.lemonde.fr/vous/article/2008/01/11/alice_998494_3238.html
https://www.publico.pt/2005/10/06/culturaipsilon/critica/a-imagem-vazia-1653260
https://www.snpcultura.org/amar_as_diferencas.html
https://www.publico.pt/2013/05/17/culturaipsilon/noticia/filme-do-realizador-marco-martins-tem-estreia-mundial-no-louvre-1594641
https://www.publico.pt/2017/03/16/culturaipsilon/critica/sao-jorge-1765263
https://www.hollywoodreporter.com/review/saint-george-sao-jorge-924958
https://expresso.pt/cultura/2017-03-09-Sao-Jorge-a-crise-financeira-derrotou-nos-fisicamente
https://www.leparisien.fr/festival-de-cannes/saint-georges-nous-met-ko-17-05-2017-6955704.php
https://www.lefigaro.fr/cinema/2017/05/17/03002-20170517ARTFIG00204--saint-georges-boxer-savie.php
https://www.publico.pt/2018/12/21/culturaipsilon/noticia/marco-martins-lancou-achas-fogueira-1855152

Portuguese film directors
Portuguese screenwriters
Male screenwriters
Portuguese male writers
Living people
People from Lisbon
1972 births
Lisbon Theatre and Film School alumni